Torbjörn, Thorbjörn, Torbjørn, or Thorbjørn (given name) are modern Swedish, Norwegian and Danish forms of the Old Norse and Icelandic name Þorbjörn, meaning thunder (from the name Thor) and bear.

Other variants of the name include the Danish/German form Torben and the predominantly German form Thorben. English variants include Thurburn, Thorburn, Thorbern, Thorebern, Thorber, and Thurber, which are, however, normally used as surnames. Tubby is common in the Norfolk area of England and the early whaling communities of North America.

The Icelandic short form is "Tobbi"; the Swedish is "Tobbe." The supposed site of Þorbjörn's farm in Hrafnkels saga was known as "Tobbahól" by the locals.

Notable people named Torbjörn 
 Torbjørn Agdestein (born 1991), Norwegian footballer
 Torbjörn Arvidsson (born 1968), Swedish football player
 Torbjörn Axelman (born 1932), Swedish TV producer, director and writer
 Torbjørn Bergerud (born 1994), Norwegian handball player
 Thorbjørn Berntsen (born 1935), former Norwegian politician representing the Labour Party
 Torbjörn Björlund (born 1957), Swedish politician
 Torbjörn Blomdahl (born 1962), Swedish billiards player
 Torbjörn Blomqvist (1941–2017), Finnish sprint canoer
 Torbjørn Bratt ( c.1502 – 1548), Norwegian clergyman
 Torbjørn Brundtland (born 1975), band member of the Norwegian electronic music duo, Röyksopp
 Torbjörn Caspersson (1910–1997), Swedish cytologist and geneticist
 Torbjørn Clausen (1931–2001), Norwegian boxer
 Þorbjörn dísarskáld, late-10th century Icelandic skald (poet)
 Knut Torbjørn Eggen (1960–2012), Norwegian football coach and player
 Thorbjørn Egner (1912–1990), Norwegian playwright, songwriter and illustrator
 Torbjörn Ek (1949–2010), Swedish bandy- and soccer player
 Torbjörn Eriksson (born 1971), Swedish athlete
 Torbjörn Evrell (1920–2008), Swedish inventor and businessman
 Thorbjörn Fälldin (1926–2016), Swedish politician
 Thorbjørn Feyling (1907–1985), Norwegian ceramist, Head of design at Stavangerflint AS
 Torbjörn Flygt (born 1964), Swedish novelist
 Thorbjørn Frydenlund (1892–1989), Norwegian wrestler
 Torbjørn Gaarder (1885–1970), Norwegian chemist
 Thorbjørn Gjølstad (1942–2015), Norwegian jurist and civil servant
 Óli Þorbjörn Guðbjartsson (born 1935), Icelandic politician and former minister
 Torbjørn Hansen (born 1972), Norwegian politician
 Thorbjørn Harr (born 1974), Norwegian actor
 Halvor Thorbjørn Hjertvik (1914–1995), Norwegian politician for the Christian Democratic Party
 Þorbjörn Hornklofi, 9th-century Norwegian skald, court poet of King Harald Fairhair
 Thorbjørn Jagland (born 1950), Norwegian politician from Norwegian Labour Party
 Þorbjörn Jensson (born 1953), Icelandic former handball player
 Torbjörn Johansson (born 1970), Swedish middle-distance runner
 Torbjörn Jonsson (born 1936), Swedish footballer
 Kjell Thorbjørn Kristensen (1927–1995), Norwegian politician for the Labour Party
 Torbjørn Kristoffersen (1892–1986), Norwegian gymnast
 Thorbjørn Kultorp (1929–2004), Norwegian politician for the Labour Party
 Thorbjørn Lie (1943–2006), Norwegian businessperson, politician for the Progress Party
 Torbjörn "Ebbot" Lundberg (born 1966), Swedish artist, songwriter and music producer
 Torbjørn Løkken (born 1963), Norwegian nordic combined skier
 Torbjörn Martin (born 1981), Swedish film and music video director
 Thorbjorn N. Mohn (1844–1899), American Lutheran church leader, president of St. Olaf College
 Torbjörn Nilsson (born 1954), soccer player
 Thorbjørn Olesen (born 1989), Danish golfer
 Thorbjørn Holst Rasmussen (born 1987), former Danish footballer
 Torbjörn "Pugh" Rogefelt (born 1947), Swedish singer, musician, guitarist and songwriter
 Thorbjørn Schierup (born 1990), Danish Olympic sailor
 Thorbjørn Schwarz aka DJ Static, Danish DJ, producer, event organizer
 Torbjørn Sindballe (born 1976), Danish triathlete
 Torbjørn Sunde (born 1954), Norwegian jazz musician
 Thorbjørn Svenssen (1924–2011), Norwegian footballer
 Torbjörn Tännsjö (born 1946), Swedish philosopher
 Torbjörn Thoresson (born 1959), Swedish sprint canoer
 Thorbjorn Thorsteinsson, pirate from the Orkney Islands, executed in 1158
 Torbjørn Urfjell (born 1977), Norwegian politician for the Socialist Left Party
 Torbjørn Yggeseth (1934–2010), Norwegian ski jumper
 Torbjörn Zetterberg (born 1976), Swedish jazz musician and composer

Fictional characters 
 Torbjörn (Overwatch), a character from the 2016 video game

Mountain
 Þorbjörn (mountain) near Grindavík, Reykjanes, Iceland

See also
Thoburn
Thulborn
Turbin

References

Scandinavian masculine given names
Danish masculine given names
Norwegian masculine given names
Swedish masculine given names